Grosvenor–Strathmore (formerly Grosvenor, pronounced ) is a rapid transit station on the Red Line of the Washington Metro in North Bethesda, Maryland. Grosvenor–Strathmore is the last above-ground station for Glenmont-bound Red Line trains until NoMa-Gallaudet U; south of the station, trains cross over the Capital Beltway before descending underground. It is one of a number of stations on the Rockville Pike corridor in Montgomery County.

Location 
Named after the nearby Grosvenor Lane, Grosvenor–Strathmore station lies within the unincorporated area of North Bethesda. Located to the east of Rockville Pike at its intersection with Tuckerman Lane, the main point of interest near the station is the Music Center at Strathmore. In addition, it is the first stop outside of the Capital Beltway heading outbound towards Shady Grove on the Red Line.

History 
Service to Grosvenor (named for its proximity to Grosvenor Lane) began on August 25, 1984. Grosvenor Lane was located at the  farm of Gilbert Hovey Grosvenor (1875–1966), the father of photojournalism and the first full-time editor of National Geographic from 1899 to 1954. He moved there from the Dupont Circle area in Washington, D.C. after buying the farmland in 1912.

It remained the western terminus of the Red Line until the extension of that line to Shady Grove that December. Trains from Silver Spring terminated here during peak times until December 2018. 

In February 2005, the Music Center at Strathmore opened adjacent to the station, prompting the name change to Grosvenor–Strathmore. The arts complex and station are connected via an elevated pedestrian walkway, the Carlton R. Sickles Memorial Sky Bridge. Escalators and an underground walkway were also added to the station to allow customers to easily cross the busy road, Rockville Pike, that is adjacent to the station.

From March 26, 2020 until June 28, 2020, this station was closed due to the 2020 coronavirus pandemic.

Station layout 
Grosvenor has one island platform located just east of Rockville Pike. Access to the station is provided by a passageway connecting the Pike and a large parking lot and garage east of the station. Bus bays and a kiss and ride lot are east of the station, but there is also a bus stop west of the station on Rockville Pike. The tracks in the open cut continue in a tunnel north of the station, and becomes briefly elevated south of the station before going underground.

References

External links

 Rockville Pike entrance from Google Maps Street View

Washington Metro stations in Maryland
Stations on the Red Line (Washington Metro)
Railway stations in Montgomery County, Maryland
Railway stations in the United States opened in 1984
1984 establishments in Maryland
North Bethesda, Maryland